Antoni Kalina (1846–1905) was a Polish activist, ethnographer and ethnologist, and rector of the Lviv University.

1846 births
1905 deaths
Polish activists
Polish ethnographers
Polish ethnologists
University of Lviv rectors